The 2017 Houston Cougars football team represented the University of Houston in the 2017 NCAA Division I FBS football season. The Cougars played their home games at TDECU Stadium in Houston, Texas, and competed in the West Division of the American Athletic Conference. They were led by first-year head coach Major Applewhite. They finished the season 7–5, 5–3 in AAC play to finish in second place in the West Division. They were invited to the Hawaii Bowl where they lost to Fresno State.

Roster

Schedule
Houston announced its 2017 football schedule on February 9, 2017. The 2017 schedule originally consisted of six home games and six road games in the regular season, but the road game versus UTSA was canceled. The Cougars hosted AAC foes East Carolina, Memphis, Navy, and SMU, and traveled to South Florida, Temple, Tulane, and Tulsa.

The Cougars hosted two of their three non-conference opponents, Rice from Conference USA (CUSA) and Texas Tech from the Big 12 Conference. They traveled to Arizona from  the Pac-12 Conference. Houston was originally scheduled to travel to UTSA of CUSA but that game was canceled.

The game between Houston and UTSA originally scheduled for September 2 at the Alamodome in San Antonio was initially postponed due to the aftermath of Hurricane Harvey. However, on Wednesday, September 6, 2017, officials from the two schools agreed that the previously postponed game would not be made up during the season.
As a result of Hurricane Irma, Houston played at USF on Saturday, October 28 (instead of November 4), and hosted ECU on Saturday, November 4 (instead of October 28).

Schedule Source:

Game summaries

at Arizona

Rice

Texas Tech

at Temple

SMU

at Tulsa

Memphis

at South Florida

East Carolina

at Tulane

Navy

vs. Fresno State (Hawaii Bowl)

Players in the 2018 NFL Draft

References

Houston
Houston Cougars football seasons
Houston Cougars football